Falcon is a post-quantum signature scheme selected by the NIST at the fourth round of the post-quantum standardisation process.
It has been designed by Thomas Prest, Pierre-Alain Fouque, Jeffrey Hoffstein, Paul Kirchner, Vadim Lyubashevsky, Thomas Pornin, Thomas Ricosset, Gregor Seiler, William Whyte and Zhenfei Zhang.
It relies on the hash-and-sign technique over the Gentry, Peikert and Vaikuntanathan framework over NTRU lattices.
The name Falcon is an acronym for Fast Fourier lattice-based compact signatures over NTRU.

Properties 

The design rationale of Falcon takes advantage of multiple tools to ensure compactness and efficiency with provable security.
To achieve this goal, the use of a NTRU lattice allows the size of the signatures and public-key to be relatively small, while Fast Fourier sampling permits efficient signature computations.

From a security point of view, the Gentry, Peikert and Vaikuntanathan framework enjoys a security reduction in the Quantum Random Oracle Model.

Implementations and Performances 

The authors of Falcon provide a reference implementation in C and one in Python.

The set of parameters suggested by Falcon imply signatures of size 666 bytes for the NIST security level 1 (security comparable to breaking AES-128 bits). The key generation can be performed in 8.64 ms with a throughput of approximatively 6,000 signature per second and 28,000 verifications per second.

On the other hand, the NIST security level 5 (comparable to breaking AES-256) requires signature of 1,280 bytes, a key generation under 28 ms and a throughput of 2,900 signatures per second and 13,650 verifications per second.

See also 

 Post-quantum cryptography
 Lattice-based cryptography
 NTRU
 NIST Post-Quantum Cryptography Standardization

References 
1. 
2. 
3. 
4. 
5. 
6. 
7. 
8. 

Asymmetric-key algorithms
Digital signature schemes
Lattice-based cryptography